October 18, 1936 - The first Buenos Aires Grand Prix (official name: I Gran Premio Ciudad de Buenos Aires),  was a Fuerza Libre race, run at the Costanera Norte circuit in three elimination heats and 1 final of 30 laps (2,65 km = 79,5 km), qualifying the top 11 drivers for the final. The entry list consisted of South American drivers. Heat 1 was won by Enrique Moyano (Ford), Heat 2 by Brazilian Manoel de Teffé (Alfa Romeo) and Zatuszek (Mercedes Benz) won the third.

Argentinian drivers dominated the final with Arzani placing first, Zatuszek second and Brosutti taking third on the podium to give Argentina a triple victory. De Teffé in fourth place was the only non Argentinian in the top six, followed by Moyano and Angel Garabato (Chrysler). Grid or race numbers are not currently available.

Classification

Notes
Manuel de Teffé (Baron Manuel de Teffé von Hoonholtz - *March 30, 1905 ↑January 1, 1967) was among the most prominent south-American drivers of the era before Chico Landi. De Teffé is credited with being instrumental for bringing European drivers to race in Brazil during the late 30s and was the main creator of the Gávea circuit and its races.

References

Buenos Aires Grand Prix
Buenos Aires Grand Prix
Buenos Aires Grand Prix